Catalina de la Rosa (d. 1646), was a Spanish stage actress.

She married the actor-manager Nicolás Pedro de la Rosa (1613–1675) in 1635. Together, they founded the highly successful theatre company "La Compañía de la Rosa" in 1636, which was favored by the queen, Elisabeth of France (1602–1644). They toured around Spain and founded several theatres in several cities.

References 

17th-century births
1646 deaths
17th-century Spanish actresses
17th-century theatre managers
17th-century Spanish businesspeople